Ping.fm was an advertising-supported social networking and micro-blogging web service that enabled users to post to multiple social networks simultaneously.

Making an update on Ping.fm pushed the update to a number of different social websites at once. This allowed individuals using multiple social networks to update their status only once, without having to update it in all their social media individually. Ping.fm grouped services into three categories – status updates, blogs, and micro-blogs – and updates could be sent to each group separately.

Ping.fm was shut down on 5 July 2012, to be replaced by Seesmic Ping. Seesmic was later acquired by HootSuite.

History 
Ping.fm was created with the intent of making it as easy as possible to post updates to multiple social networking sites simultaneously for free. This service has been discontinued.

Open Beta
After six months of being in closed beta, an announcement was made on 2 September 2008 that would no longer require private invite beta codes to be used to register and use the service. The launch into Open Beta was covered by outlets like Wired, and Mashable.

Comparisons with similar websites
Ping.fm has been compared favorably to other websites with similar functionality like HelloTxt, which shut down in August 2012.

Technology
Ping.fm is powered by LAMP (Linux, Apache, MySQL, PHP) with some .NET used in the core software. An API allows programmers to apply for an application key in order to develop third party applications. Users must apply for an API key through their user profile.

Supported services
A user can configure his or her Ping.fm account to aggregate content to the following services:

 Bebo
 Blogger
 Brightkite
 Google Buzz (See note below)
 custom URL
 Delicious
 Facebook
 FriendFeed
 Friendster
 hi5
 Identi.ca
 Jaiku (now owned by Google)
 Kwippy
 Koornk
 StatusNet
 LinkedIn
 LiveJournal
 Mashable
 MySpace
 Plaxo
 Plurk
 Pownce
 Rejaw
 Tumblr
 Twitter
 WordPress.com
 Xanga
 Yahoo 360
 Multiply
 YouAre

Note: Google Buzz was discontinued by Google on December 15, 2011.

Acquisition by Seesmic
On 4 January 2010, Seesmic announced that it would be acquiring Ping.fm. In May 2012, Seesmic announced in its blog that Ping.fm would be closed in June 2012.

In September 2012, Seesmic was acquired by HootSuite.

References

External links
 PING (closed down site)

Defunct social networking services
Web services
Android (operating system) software
BlackBerry software